Principality of Gützkow was an independent principality in Western Pomerania that existed in the Middle Ages until c. 1128. It was inhabited by the Lutici tribe and was centred around its capital, Gützkow. Around 1128, it was conquered by the Duchy of Pomerania and reorganised into Castellany of Gützkow. The sources written by Otto mention princeps Mitzlaw of Gützkow to be the ruler of the state around 1128.

History 
Until the 12th century, the burgh of Gützkow was a center of the principality inhabited by the Lutici tribe. By the time when Otto of Bamberg had converted the area into Christianity, the state was already conquered by the Duchy of Pomerania and reorganized into Castellany of Gützkow.

Notes

Bibliography 

Wächter, Joachim: Zur Geschichte der Besiedlung des mittleren Peeneraums. In: Beiträge zur Geschichte Vorpommerns: die Demminer Kolloquien 1985–1994. Thomas Helms Verlag, Schwerin 1997,  
Wächter, Joachim: Das Fürstentum Rügen - Ein Überblick. In: Beiträge zur Geschichte Vorpommerns: die Demminer Kolloquien 1985–1994. Thomas Helms Verlag, Schwerin 1997,  
Wöller, Werner: Vor- und Frühgeschichte, Mittelalter und frühe Neuzeit. In: Ortsgeschichtskommission Gützkow beim Rat der Stadt Gützkow (publ.): Heimatgeschichte von Gützkow und Umgebung. Heft 2/1990, pp. 4–23 

History of Pomerania
11th century in Europe
Former countries in Europe
Former monarchies of Europe
Former states and territories of Mecklenburg-Western Pomerania
Former principalities
States and territories disestablished in the 1120s